Egide or Égide is a masculine given name which may refer to:

 Égide de Boeck (1875–1944), Belgian Catholic priest, bishop, Apostolic Vicar and linguist in the then Belgian Congo
 Egide Duny or Egidio Duni (1708–1775), Italian opera composer
 Egide Fologne (1830–1919), Belgian entomologist
 Egide François Leemans (1839–1883), Belgian painter, draughtsman and engraver
 Egide Linnig (1821–1860), Belgian painter, draughtsman and engraver
 Egide Nzojibwami, Burundian geologist and academic, first Burundian member of The Church of Jesus Christ of Latter-day Saints (Mormons)
 Égide Rombaux (1865–1942), Belgian sculptor
 Egide Walschaerts (1820–1901), Belgian mechanical engineer and inventor
 Egide Charles Gustave, Baron Wappers or Gustave Wappers (1803–1874), Belgian painter

See also
 Egidio

Masculine given names